This page lists notable Australian bicycle brands and manufacturing companies past and present. This article relates to pedal cycles, tricycles  and power assisted cycles but does not include Motorcycles. For bicycle parts, see List of bicycle part manufacturing companies.

Many bicycle brands do not manufacture their own product, but rather import and re-brand bikes manufactured by others, sometimes designing the bike, specifying the equipment, and providing quality control. There are also brands that have, at different times, been manufacturers as well as re-branders: a company with manufacturing capability may market models made by other factories, while simultaneously manufacturing bicycles in-house.

Only brands or manufacturers that are notable as a bicycle brand should be included in this list. If no page exists for the company or brand, then the page to be linked to should be created first or a reference provided as to its notability or the entry will probably be removed.

A 

 Allegro Bikes
 Apollo Bicycles
 Azzurri Bikes

B 

 Bair Electric Bikes
 Bastion Cycles
 Baum Cycles

C 

 Cleverley Electric Bikes
 Chappelli Cycles
 Ciombola
 Colony BMX
 The Copier Company
 Curve Cycling
 Cyclops

D 

 Deubel Bicycles
 Devlin Custom Cycles

F 

 Forgotten Bike Co.
 Furnari

G 

 Gellie Custom Bikes
 Goldcross Cycles

H 

 Healing Cycles
 HTech Bikes

I 

 i am free

K 

 Kids Bike Company
 Kumo Cycles

L 

 Llewellyn Custom Bicycles

M 

 Malvern Star
 Mambo
 Mooro Cycles

N 

 NIXEYCLES

O 

 Ordica Electric Bicycles

P 

 Papillionaire Bicycles
 Penny Farthing Bicycles
 Prova Cycles

R 

 Rainbow Cycles
 Reid Cycles
 Repco Sports

S 

 Sheppard Cycles
 Shifter Bikes
 Single Speed Cycles
 Solar Bike
 Speedwell bicycles

T 

 Tiller Rides
 Tribe Bikes

U 

 Unicycle.com Australia

V 

 Vamos Electric Bikes
 Velosmith
 Vivente
 Vuelo Velo Bicycles

W 

 Woods Bicycle Co.
 Wyld Bikes

Z 

 Zerode Bikes
 Zoomo

See also 

List of bicycle brands and manufacturing companies
Manufacturing in Australia
List of Japanese bicycle brands and manufacturers

References

 
Bicycle brands
Bicycle
Lists of brands
Lists of manufacturers
Australian bicycle brands and manufacturers